Wolverhampton Wanderers Football Club, commonly known as Wolves F.C., is an English professional football club. The club played its first match in 1877 as St Luke's F.C., after being formed by pupils of a school in Blakenhall, Wolverhampton bearing this name. Two years later they merged with the local cricket and football club The Wanderers to become Wolverhampton Wanderers.

After competing in numerous local league and cup competitions during its formative years, the club became a founder member of The Football League, the first professional league in global association football, in 1888.

The club has won a total of thirteen "major" trophies, including the League Championship three times, the FA Cup four times, the League Cup twice and the FA Charity/Community Shield four times. Wolves have also featured in UEFA competitions during seven seasons; their best performance coming in 1972 when they were runners-up in the inaugural UEFA Cup. They have also had successes in less high-profile cup competitions such as the Texaco Cup and the Football League Trophy (now the EFL Trophy).

This list details the club's performance at first team level in league and cup competitions and the top scorers for each season since their first entry into the FA Cup in 1883–84.

Seasons

Key

Pld – Matches played
W – Matches won
D – Matches drawn
L – Matches lost
GF – Goals for
GA – Goals against
Pts – Points
Pos – Final position

Prem – Premier League
Champ – EFL Championship
Lge 1 – EFL League One
FL – Football League
Div 1 – Football League First Division
Div 2 – Football League Second Division
Div 3 – Football League Third Division
Div 3(N) – Football League Third Division North
Div 4 – Football League Fourth Division

PR – Preliminary round
GS – Group stage
R1 – Round 1
R2 – Round 2
R3 – Round 3
R4 – Round 4
R5 – Round 5
R32 – Round of 32
R16 – Round of 16
QF – Quarter-finals
SF – Semi-finals
AF – Area finals
RU – Runners-up
W – Winners

Notes

References

Seasons
 
Wolverhampton Wanderers